Derry Girls is a British teen sitcom, created and written by Lisa McGee, that premiered on 4 January 2018 on Channel 4 and ran for three series. The channel's most successful comedy since Father Ted, the series was inspired by McGee's own experiences growing up in Derry, Northern Ireland, in the 1990s, during the final years of the Troubles. It stars Saoirse-Monica Jackson, Louisa Harland, Nicola Coughlan, Jamie-Lee O'Donnell, and Dylan Llewellyn as five teenagers living in mid-1990s Derry while attending Our Lady Immaculate College, a fictional girls' Catholic secondary school based on the real-life Thornhill College, where McGee herself studied. Produced by British production company Hat Trick Productions, Derry Girls is filmed in Northern Ireland, with most scenes shot on location in Derry and some in Belfast.

Although the plot lines of Derry Girls are fictional, the series frequently references actual events of the Troubles and the Northern Ireland peace process, including the 1994 IRA ceasefire announcement, the 1995 visit to Northern Ireland of President Bill Clinton and First Lady Hillary Clinton, and the Good Friday referendum of 1998. Archival footage relating to key political figures such as Ian Paisley, Gerry Adams, Martin McGuinness, John Hume and Mo Mowlam is shown via TV and radio broadcasts in family homes. The soundtrack features popular music of the era, by acts including Ace of Base, Blur, Cypress Hill, Salt-N-Pepa, Enya, the Corrs, and the Cranberries.

The first series, broadcast on Channel 4 in January and February 2018, became the most-watched series in Northern Ireland since modern records began in 2002. The series was renewed shortly after the pilot episode aired, and the second series was broadcast in March and April 2019. A third and final series set in 1996 and 1997 was commissioned for 2020, although filming was delayed due to the COVID-19 pandemic impact on television production, and premiered in April 2022. A final special extended 45-minute episode titled "The Agreement", set in 1998 during the signing of the Good Friday Agreement, aired on 18 May 2022.

Derry Girls has inspired a mural of its main characters painted on the side of Badgers Bar and Restaurant at 18 Orchard Street, Derry, which has become a popular tourist attraction.

Synopsis
The series follows Erin Quinn (Saoirse-Monica Jackson), her cousin Orla (Louisa Harland), their friends Clare (Nicola Coughlan), Michelle (Jamie-Lee O'Donnell), and Michelle's English cousin James (Dylan Llewellyn) as they navigate their teenage years during the end of the Troubles in Derry, where they all attend a Catholic girls' secondary school. The friends frequently find themselves in absurd situations amid the political unrest and cultural divides of the times.

Cast and characters

Main
 Saoirse-Monica Jackson as Erin Quinn. Aged 16 at the start of the series, she is passionate and ambitious, with literary aspirations, but is at times either vain or overly concerned with how she is regarded by others.
 Louisa Harland as Orla McCool. Aged 15 at the start of the series, she is Erin's detached and eccentric maternal cousin. She takes many things literally and sometimes misses social cues. She often remains quiet and absent within group situations.
 Nicola Coughlan as Clare Devlin. Intelligent and studious, and often the voice of reason in the gang, she is more intimidated than her friends by authority figures. At the end of series one, she comes out as a lesbian. Between the end of series three and the finale special, she and her mother Geraldine move to Strabane after her father's death (since Derry reminded her mother too much of Sean's death).
 Jamie-Lee O'Donnell as Michelle Mallon. The wild child of the group, she often gets her friends into trouble through her keen interest in sex, drugs, and alcohol.
 Dylan Llewellyn as James Maguire. Michelle's maternal cousin, he has grown up in London but comes to live with his aunt in Derry just before the start of the series. Out of concern for an English boy's safety at the local Christian Brothers school, James becomes the first male pupil at Our Lady Immaculate College. Although the girls make fun of James, they care about him and eventually accept him as a member of the group. Everyone in Derry assumes he is gay, despite his protestations.
 Tara Lynne O'Neill as Mary Quinn. Erin's mother and the matriarch of the Quinn family, she has been married to Gerry for 17 years at the start of the series.
 Tommy Tiernan as Gerry Quinn. Mary's husband and Erin's father, he is from Navan and works as a delivery driver. He has a strained relationship with his father-in-law.
 Kathy Kiera Clarke as Sarah McCool. Orla's mother and Mary's younger sister, she is sweet but dim-witted, heavily focused on her own and other people's appearances. She is an inattentive mother and takes little responsibility for raising Orla.
 Ian McElhinney as Joe McCool. Mary and Sarah's father, and Erin and Orla's maternal grandfather, he moved in with the Quinns after his wife died. Joe shows nothing but contempt for Gerry, constantly criticising him and encouraging Mary to leave him.
 Siobhán McSweeney as Sister George Michael, a Catholic nun. The headmistress of Our Lady Immaculate College, she rules the school with an iron fist. She views being a nun as a job rather than a calling, treating priests with indifference or even contempt and joking that she became a nun for the free accommodation.
 Leah O'Rourke as Jenny Joyce, a prefect and a suck-up despised by the friends. She is from a wealthy family (Jenny's father, a surgeon at Altnagelvin Hospital, once removed Orla's tonsils) and lives in a large house. Her mother Janette used to be friends with Mary, Sarah, Geraldine and Deirdre when they were teenagers back in 1977, but she drifted apart from them.

Recurring
 Ava Grace McAleese and Mya Rose McAleese as Anna Quinn, Erin's toddler sister. She is often seen, but is only referenced in dialogue once in the first episode where Gerry states that him and Mary have two children.
 Beccy Henderson as Aisling, Jenny's best friend and sidekick.
 Claire Rafferty as Miss Mooney, Sister Michael's deputy.
 Amelia Crowley as Deirdre Mallon, Michelle's mother and James' maternal aunt, who is a nurse.
 Kevin McAleer as Colm McCool, Joe's brother and Mary and Sarah's paternal uncle, known for telling stories in a slow, ponderous style, with numerous digressions. His family avoids him whenever possible.
 Paul Mallon as Dennis, the aggressive proprietor of the corner shop the friends frequent.
 Philippa Dunne as Geraldine Devlin, Clare's mother.
 Peter Campion as Father Peter Conway, a young priest on whom most of the girls (and James) have a crush.
 Jamie Beamish as Ciaran, Sarah's love interest who works at a photography chain store.
 Robert Calvert as Jim-across-the-road, the Quinns' neighbour.
 Maria Laird as Tina O'Connell, a younger schoolmate of James and the girls, whom they once failed to intimidate and who now despises them.
 Ardal O'Hanlon as Eamonn, Mary and Sarah's maternal first cousin.
 David Ireland as Sean Devlin, Clare's father. He makes his final appearance at the end of series 3, when he suffers from an aneurysm and dies after Clare visits him at his hospital bed.
 Julia Dearden as Maureen Malarkey, an elderly neighbour of the Quinns.

Production
Filming took place in Northern Ireland, with most scenes being shot in Derry and Belfast. The scenes onboard the train in S3 E3 took place at the Downpatrick and County Down Railway in Downpatrick, with the end of the episode being shot at the then-recently-closed Barry's Amusements in Portrush.

The show was renewed for a second series shortly after the airing of the pilot episode of the first series. Production of the second series began on 8 October 2018. The second series began airing on 5 March 2019. On 9 April 2019, immediately after the second series finale, it was confirmed by Channel 4 that Derry Girls would return for a third series. Production of the third series was due to commence in the spring of 2020, but was suspended following the announcement of the COVID-19 lockdown. On 21 July 2021, Nicola Coughlan confirmed that filming for the third series was set to commence in late 2021, with a premiere in early 2022. On 23 September 2021, series creator and writer Lisa McGee confirmed Derry Girls would end with its third series, stating "it was always the plan to say goodbye after three series." On 21 December 2021, McGee and Coughlan announced on social media that filming of the final series had completed.

Broadcast
The first series premiered on Channel 4 in the United Kingdom on Thursday nights at 10:00 pm, while the second series was moved to Tuesday nights at 9:15 pm, with the exception of the sixth episode, which was aired at 9:00 pm. The entire series is available to stream in the UK on All 4.

The series was picked up by Netflix internationally, with series 1 being released on 21 December 2018. Series 2 was released on 2 August 2019. The international version of the first series is now available to stream on Netflix in the UK and Ireland. The second series was added on 9 July 2020, but was temporarily removed from the service as it was mistakenly released a year early. The third and final series was released on 7 October 2022.

Episodes

Series 1 (2018)

Series 2 (2019)

Series 3 (2022)

Reception
Derry Girls has become Channel 4's most successful comedy since Father Ted.

Derry Girls mural 
Located at 18 Orchard Street in Derry, a mural of the main cast of characters can be seen on the side of Badger's Bar. This popular tourist attraction was created by UV Arts and is one of many murals across the city. Derry is known for politically charged art, and the famed mural speaks to the popularity of the television programme and its relation to cultural change in the area.

Critical reception
Derry Girls has received critical acclaim. On Rotten Tomatoes, the first series holds an approval rating of 100% based on reviews from 24 critics with an average rating of 7.9/10. The website's critics consensus states: "A perfectly curated cast and raw writing drive Derry Girls dark humor as creator Lisa McGee makes frenetic light of teen life in 1990s Northern Ireland".

The second series has an approval rating of 97%, based on reviews from 33 critics with an average rating of 8.3/10. The website's critics consensus states: "The sophomore season of Derry Girls doesn't lose any of its irreverent charms thanks to its predictably unpredictable romps and canny characterizations".

The third series holds a "Certified Fresh" approval rating of 100%, based on reviews from 21 critics with an average rating of 8.9/10. The website's critics consensus states: "Parting is such sweet sorrow, but Derry Girls' final season promises to milk as many laughs as it can before viewers say a fond farewell to this lovable band of miscreants." On Metacritic, which uses a weighted average, it received a score of 86 out of 100 based on five critic reviews, indicating "universal acclaim".

Derry Girls was the most watched series in Northern Ireland since modern records began in 2002, with an average audience of 519,000 viewers and a 64.2 per cent share of the audience. Una Mullally of The Irish Times praised the series: "The writing in Derry Girls is sublime, the performances perfect, the casting is brilliant." On 11 January 2018, after the first episode had aired, the programme was renewed for a second series. Each episode was watched by over two million people. At the conclusion of the first series, Barbara Ellen of The Guardian wrote that Derry Girls evoked such programmes as The Inbetweeners, Father Ted and Bad Education.

Public reception 
As there are slight political undertones to the show, responses have highlighted the comedic nature as keeping the material lighthearted enough to enjoy. Certain writers from various online articles have noted that their own Northern Irish family appreciated the way the show gave an honest portrayal of how life was for teens in the Troubles, and how much was endured by families during that time. The way it portrayed the events and circumstances with a sense of normality echoed the real lives of both Protestants and Catholics in that area.

Lisa McGee based events in the programme on her own life, such as writing a letter to the Clintons' daughter, Chelsea. Adding real stories such as this to the episodes grounded the show in a way that allowed viewers to connect with the teenage attitudes of the characters, and served as a stark contrast to the events around them. The juxtaposition of the Troubles violence and teenage life resonated with many viewers and critics alike, making it one of the features of the show that made it so successful.

Popular culture 
The Simpsons episode "You Won't Believe What This Episode Is About – Act Three Will Shock You!", which aired on 13 March 2022, features an ice cream parlour called Dairy Girls Ice Cream. Simpsons writer Matt Selman confirmed in a Tweet that it was a reference to Derry Girls, adding it was "the least we could do".

Ratings

Accolades

Merchandise
A Derry Girls book, titled Erin's Diary: An Official Derry Girls Book, was released on 12 November 2020 by Trapeze Books.

In April 2022, a relaunch of the now-defunct British magazine Smash Hits, which ceased publication in 2006, issued a special, one-off edition, featuring Derry Girls, in promotion for its third series.

In other media

The Crystal Maze special 
Cast members Saoirse-Monica Jackson, Jamie-Lee O'Donnell, Louisa Harland, Nicola Coughlan and Dylan Llewellyn appeared in a 2018 special episode of the British game show The Crystal Maze. The episode raised money for Stand Up to Cancer UK and was well received by viewers and fans of the show.

Great British Bake Off holiday episode
For the 2020 New Year holiday, the cast competed on a special episode of The Great British Bake Off. Cast members Coughlan, O'Donnell, Llewellyn, Siobhán McSweeney, and Jackson all appeared for the special.

In GBBO fashion, there were three challenges to be completed and tasted by judges Paul Hollywood and Prue Leith. The first challenge was a trifle, then blinis in the technical round, finishing with a showstopper tiered cake that each member had to design in a decades theme. At the end of the competition, Jackson was declared the winner.

References

External links
 
 
 Online Independent news article detailing the popularity of Derry Girls

2018 British television series debuts
2022 British television series endings
2010s British black comedy television series
2010s British teen sitcoms
2020s British black comedy television series
2020s British teen sitcoms
Catholicism in fiction
Channel 4 sitcoms
English-language television shows
Religious comedy television series
Television productions suspended due to the COVID-19 pandemic
Television series about cousins
Television series about teenagers
Television series by Hat Trick Productions
Television series set in the 1990s
Television series set in 1994
Television series set in 1995
Television series set in 1996
Television series set in 1997
Television series set in 1998
Television shows filmed in Northern Ireland
Television shows set in Derry (city)
Television shows set in Northern Ireland
Works about The Troubles (Northern Ireland)
Coming-of-age television shows